Arthur Grant Campbell (1916 – July 17, 1996) was a Canadian diplomat. He held diplomatic posts throughout the world, including Botswana, Lesotho, South Africa, Swaziland, Norway, and Iceland.

Education and Second World War 
Campbell studied at Selwyn House School in Montreal and Upper Canada College in Toronto before receiving his Bachelor of Arts at McGill University in 1938. He began his working career in 1938, working as an assistant to the secretary of the Canadian Chamber of Commerce. He served with the Canadian Army between 1941-1946 during World War II. Campbell served in the United Kingdom, Central Mediterranean, and Northwest Europe. After World War II Campbell joined the United Nations Secretariat.

Foreign service 

Campbell joined the United Nations division of the Department of External Affairs in 1956 and thereafter was appointed to various other diplomatic positions. He served as the Canadian High Commission to Botswana, Lesotho, and Swaziland  between 1972–1976, and as Ambassador to South Africa between 1972–1976, and Norway and Iceland between 1977-1981.

Personal life
In 1940, Campbell married Carol Wright.  They had a son, Ian.

Death
According to ancestry.com, Campbell died on July 17, 1996.

References 

1916 births
Ambassadors of Canada to South Africa
Ambassadors of Canada to Norway
Ambassadors of Canada to Iceland
1996 deaths
Canadian military personnel of World War II
Canadian Army personnel of World War II